Croix de Chavaux is a station on line 9 of the Paris Métro, at the crossroads called Croix de Chavaux. The "chavaux" in the name of the crossroads is probably a corruption of the French "chevaux" ("horses"). The "croix" (French for "cross) may be a reference to the crossroads or to a wayside cross.

History 
The station was opened on 14 October 1937 with the extension of the line from Porte de Montreuil to Mairie de Montreuil.

In 2019, the station was used by 4,954,717 passengers, making it the 85th busiest of the Métro network out of 302 stations.

In 2020, the station was used by 2,839,564 passengers amidst the COVID-19 pandemic, making it the 60th busiest of the Métro network out of 305 stations.

Passenger services

Access 
The station has 5 accesses:

 Access 1: Place Jacques-Duclos
 Access 2: rue de Paris
 Access 3: Boulevard Chanzy – Center commercial
 Access 4: rue Kléber – Office du Tourisme
 Access 5: Place du Marché

Station layout

Platforms 
The station has a standard configuration with 2 tracks surrounded by 2 side platforms.

Other connections 
The station is also served by lines 102, 115, 122, and 127 of the RATP bus network, and at night, by lines N16 and N34 of the Noctilien bus network.

Gallery

References
Roland, Gérard (2003). Stations de métro. D’Abbesses à Wagram. Éditions Bonneton.

Paris Métro line 9
Paris Métro stations in Montreuil, Seine-Saint-Denis
Railway stations in France opened in 1937